Herbert Neumann (born 14 November 1953) is a German former professional footballer who played as a  midfielder.

Club career 
Neumann was born in Cologne. He played for 1. FC Köln, Udinese Calcio, Bologna, Olympiacos Piraeus, and FC Chiasso. In the Bundesliga Neumann scored 36 goals in 194 matches.

International career 
In 1978 Neumann made his one international appearance for West Germany national team.

Coaching career 
After his professional career as a player, Neumann started to work as a football manager for FC Zürich, RSC Anderlecht, Istanbulspor, NAC Breda, Vitesse, and VVV-Venlo.

References

External links 
 
 
 
 Herbert Neumann at beijen.net 

1953 births
Living people
Footballers from Cologne
German footballers
Association football midfielders
Germany international footballers
Germany B international footballers
German football managers
1. FC Köln players
Udinese Calcio players
Bologna F.C. 1909 players
Olympiacos F.C. players
FC Chiasso players
Bundesliga players
Serie A players
Super League Greece players
FC Chiasso managers
FC Zürich managers
VVV-Venlo managers
SBV Vitesse managers
R.S.C. Anderlecht managers
İstanbulspor managers
NAC Breda managers
German expatriate footballers
German expatriate football managers
German expatriate sportspeople in Italy
Expatriate footballers in Italy
German expatriate sportspeople in Greece
Expatriate footballers in Greece
Expatriate footballers in Switzerland
Expatriate football managers in Switzerland
German expatriate sportspeople in Belgium
Expatriate football managers in Belgium
German expatriate sportspeople in the Netherlands
Expatriate football managers in the Netherlands
German expatriate sportspeople in Turkey
Expatriate football managers in Turkey